Stacy Martin (born 20 March 1990) is a French actress. Her breakthrough role was playing Joe as a young woman in Lars von Trier's 2013 drama film Nymphomaniac.

Early life
Martin was born in Paris, where she spent her early childhood. She moved to Tokyo when she was seven, where she lived with her French father, René Martin, a hairstylist, and her English mother, Annette, until she was thirteen. She then returned to Paris. After finishing school, she moved to London to study Media and Cultural Studies at the University of the Arts London's College of Communication whilst modelling on the side. She studied the Meisner technique of acting at the Actors' Temple.

Career
In 2013, Martin starred as Young Joe aged 15 to 31, in the drama film Nymphomaniac. For her role in the film, which had real sex scenes and featured hardcore porn in some cases; Martin had a "porn double" and used a prosthetic vagina. The role earned her nominations for Best Actress from two Danish organizations, the Robert Awards and the Bodil Awards. She was also a part of the Breakthrough Brits of 2014 which was organized by BAFTA to recognize emerging talents. She played Faye in the 2015 film High-Rise and Young Dora in Tale of Tales, also in 2015.

As a model, Martin was part of the Rag & Bone Spring 2014 campaign and the Miu Miu 2014 and 2015 Fall/Winter campaigns, and served as the face of Miu Miu's first fragrance.

Filmography

Awards and nominations

References

External links

 

1991 births
Living people
French film actresses
Actresses from Paris
21st-century French actresses
French expatriates in Japan
French expatriates in England
French people of English descent